Mosaddek Iftekhar (born 26 December 1989) is a Bangladeshi cricketer. He made his Twenty20 debut for Khelaghar Samaj Kallyan Samity in the 2018–19 Dhaka Premier Division Twenty20 Cricket League on 26 February 2019.

References

External links
 

1989 births
Living people
Bangladeshi cricketers
Khelaghar Samaj Kallyan Samity cricketers
Place of birth missing (living people)